Denis Buckley may refer to:
 Denis Buckley – Irish rugby union player
 Denis Buckley (Medal of Honor) – Canadian soldier

See also 
 Dennis Burkley
 USS Dennis J. Buckley (DD-808)
 USS Dennis J. Buckley (DE-553)